The Women Poets' Prize is an award for poets. It is awarded biennially by the Rebecca Swift Foundation to three female poets. The award and foundation were established in 2018 to honor the memory of Rebecca Swift, a poet, essayist, editor, and founder of The Literary Consultancy. The goals are to support "poetry and the empowerment of women" and a diverse group of poets. It was announced at the Second Home Poetry Festival in June 2018. Each of the three winners receives £1,000 and support from the Rebecca Swift Foundation and its partner organizations and two mentors, one for poetry and one to help them with their life. In 2018, the award accepted submissions in June and July before announcing a shortlist later in the year and the winners in October. For the first year of the award, 2018, the jurors were Moniza Alvi, Fiona Sampson, and Sarah Howe. In 2018, the first shortlist for the award included nine poets: Jenna Clarke, Claire Collison, Alice Hiller, Holly Hopkins, Bryony Littlefair, Anita Pati, Nina Mingya Powles, Em Strang, and Jemilea Wisdom-Baako. Ultimately, the award was given, on 31 October 2018, to Claire Collison, Anita Pati, and Nina Mingya Powles. According to Bustle and The Guardian, Powles was selected for her work's "incredible originality" and Collison was selected because her work was "mesmerising, with unusual and subtle shifts," while the judges said that Pati's work was "full of linguistic and sonic quirk, with a great display of emotional intelligence."

References 

2018 establishments in the United Kingdom
Awards established in 2018
British poetry awards